The ZG convoys were a series of Caribbean convoys which ran during the Battle of the Atlantic in World War II.

They take their name from the route: Cristóbal, Colón, Panama to Guantanamo, Cuba.

Overview 
The ZG series was the reverse of GZ series that ran from 31 August 1942 until 7 May 1945. There were 141 ZG convoys, comprising 950 individual ship listings and 86 escort ships listed. Almost all ships listed in a convoy made the complete trip between Cristóbal and Guantanamo with a few going to Kingston, Jamaica.

The series started with ZG 1 through ZG 139. There are no ships listed as being lost.

Convoy List

1942

1943

1944 
There are no escorts list for 1944.

1945 
There are no escorts listed for 1945.

Notes 
Citations

Bibliography 

Books
 
 
 
Online resources

External links 
 Full listing of ships sailing in ZG convoys

ZG 0
Battle of the Atlantic
Caribbean Sea operations of World War II